Blanche of Lancaster, Baroness Wake of Liddell (c. 1305-c. 1380) was an English noblewoman. She was the eldest daughter of Henry, 3rd Earl of Lancaster and Maud Chaworth. Blanche was named after her grandmother, Blanche of Artois, who had ruled Navarre as regent.

Life 
Sometime before 9 October 1316, she married Thomas Wake, 2nd Baron Wake of Liddell, who had been under guardianship of her father. The marriage remained childless.

The Bishop of Ely burned down some of her houses after her husband's death in 1349 and she took legal action against him. Edward III rebuked the bishop for the arson, and ordered him to pay damages. The bishop subsequently had her servant William Holm murdered. Edward then confiscated his possessions and made him ask for forgiveness.

After her brother Henry died, she was one of the executors of his will. In April 1372, custody of brothers John and Thomas was granted to her, as sister of their grandmother, Joan of Lancaster. She lived on to see the start of the reign of King Edward's grandson, Richard II.

Ancestry

Notes

Works cited

 

1300s births
1380s deaths
Year of birth uncertain
Year of death uncertain
Blanche of Lancaster, Baroness Wake of Liddell
14th-century English people
14th-century English women
Daughters of British earls